Live with the Ulster Orchestra is a live album by Irish Celtic rock band Horslips, recorded with the Ulster Orchestra on St Patrick's Day 2011, at the Belfast Waterfront for BBC Northern Ireland.  The inspiration for the performance came after Paul Brady's set with an orchestra the previous year, after which BBC executive producer Declan McGovern suggested doing something similar with Horslips.  Rehearsals with the 69-piece orchestra took place the day before and the concert was recorded for BBC Northern Ireland.  The setlist is drawn principally from the band's albums The Táin and The Book of Invasions.

Track listing

Personnel 
Horslips
 Barry Devlin – bass guitar, vocals
 Johnny Fean – guitars, banjo, vocals
 Jim Lockhart – keyboards, flute, tin whistles, uilleann pipes, vocals
 Charles O'Connor – fiddle, mandolin, concertina, vocals

Ulster Orchestra
 Brian Byrne – conductor 
 Tomás Kocis – leader

Guest Musician
 Paul McAteer – drums

Production
 Horslips – production
 Richard McCullough – mixing
 Tim Martin – mastering
 Charles O'Connor, Chris Ellis – cover art

References 

2011 live albums
Horslips albums